The 2008 NCAA Division III football season, part of the college football season organized by the NCAA at the Division III level in the United States, began in August 2008, and concluded with the NCAA Division III Football Championship, also known as the Stagg Bowl, in December 2008 at Salem Football Stadium in Salem, Virginia. The Mount Union Purple Raiders won their tenth Division III championship by defeating the Wisconsin–Whitewater Warhawks, 31−26. This was the fourth of seven straight championship games between Mount Union (3 wins) and Wisconsin–Whitewater (4 wins).

The Gagliardi Trophy, given to the most outstanding player in Division III football, was awarded to Greg Micheli, quarterback from Mount Union.

Program changes
After Tri-State University changed its name to Trine University in 2008, the Tri-State Thunder became the Trine Thunder at the start of the 2008 season.

Conference standings

Conference champions

Postseason
The 2008 NCAA Division III Football Championship playoffs were the 36th annual single-elimination tournament to determine the national champion of men's NCAA Division III college football. The championship Stagg Bowl game was held at Salem Football Stadium in Salem, Virginia for the 16th time.

Qualification
Twenty-three conferences met the requirements for an automatic ("Pool A") bid to the playoffs. Besides the NESCAC, which does not participate in the playoffs, four conferences had no Pool A bid. The SLIAC was in the first year of the two-year waiting period, while the ACFC, UAA, and UMAC failed to meet the seven-member requirement. The NWC received a Pool A bid for the first time, having attained seven members and passed through the waiting period.

Schools not in Pool A conferences were eligible for Pool B. The number of Pool B bids was determined by calculating the ratio of Pool A conferences to schools in those conferences and applying that ratio to the number of Pool B schools. The 23 Pool A conferences contained 197 schools, an average of 8.6 teams per conference. Twenty-seven schools were in Pool B, enough for three bids.

The remaining six playoff spots were at-large ("Pool C") teams.

Playoff bracket

* Overtime

See also
2008 NCAA Division I FBS football season
2008 NCAA Division I FCS football season
2008 NCAA Division II football season

References